Campione may refer to:

 Campione d'Italia, comune of the Province of Como in the Lombardy region of Italy
 Campione!, Japanese light novel series written by Jō Taketsuki and illustrated by Sikorski
 Campione 2000, official song of the European football championship 2000 in the Netherlands and Belgium

Persons 

 Bunny Campione, English antiques expert
 Elaine Campione, Ontario woman who murdered her two children in Barrie, Ontario

See also 

 Champion (disambiguation)